Al Gazali Sabrinathan Nair syndrome, also known as Al Gazali-Nair syndrome is a very rare multi-systemic genetic disorder which is characterized by developmental delay, facial dysmorphy, and skeletal and ocular abnormalities. This disorder was first described in two siblings that came from consanguineous parents. No new cases have been described since 1994.

Presentation 

People with this disorder show the following signs and symptoms:
 Long eyelashes
 Frontal bossing
 Low frontal hairline
 Hypertelorism
 Medial eyebrow flare
 Low nasal bridge
 Low-set large ears
 Osteogenesis imperfecta
 Widespread developmental delay
 Wormian bones
 Epilepsy
 Blue sclerae
 Optic degeneration
 Retinal detachment

References 

Genetic diseases and disorders
Diseases named for discoverer